Comercial Esporte Clube
Comercial Esporte Clube (SP), São Paulo
Comercial Esporte Clube (PE), Pernambuco
Esporte Clube Comercial (MS), Mato Grosso do Sul
Esporte Clube Comercial (PR), Paraná